Robert McPherson (born c. 1850) was a Scottish footballer who played as a left winger.

Career
McPherson played club football for Arthurlie, and he became their first ever international player when he made his sole appearance for Scotland in 1882.

References

1850s births
Date of birth missing
Scottish footballers
Scotland international footballers
Arthurlie F.C. players
Association football wingers
Place of birth missing
Year of death missing
Place of death missing